This is a list of parishes of Eastern Orthodox Christianity in Alaska, United States.  Eastern Orthodoxy in North America is divided into several separate Eastern Orthodox Churches  Many parishes in Alaska are members of the Orthodox Church in America while others are members of the Russian Orthodox Church Outside Russia or the Russian Orthodox Church.

Aleutians East Borough

Adak 
St. Innocent Chapel (OCA-Unalaska)

Akutan 
St. Alexander Nevsky Chapel (OCA-Unalaska)

Belkofski 
Holy Resurrection Church (OCA-Unalaska)

False Pass 
St. Nicholas Chapel (OCA-Dillingham) - V. Rev. Michael Trefon

King Cove 
St. Herman Church (OCA-Dillingham) - Rev. Andrei Tepper

Sand Point 
St. Nicholas Church (OCA-Dillingham)

Aleutians West Census Area

Atka 
St. Nicholas Chapel (OCA-Unalaska)

Nikolski 
St. Nicholas Church (OCA-Unalaska)

St. George Island 
St. George Church (OCA-Unalaska) - Rev. Douglas John Kudrin

St. Paul Island 
SS. Peter and Paul Church (OCA-Unalaska) - Rev. Douglas John Kudrin

Unalaska 
Holy Ascension of Our Lord Cathedral (OCA-Unalaska) - Rev. Evon Bereskin

Municipality of Anchorage

Anchorage 
Saint James the Just Orthodox Mission Parish (ROCOR) - Pr. Luke Higgins, Dcn. Moshe Zorea
Protecting Veil of the Theotokos Orthodox Community (OCA-Anchorage)
St. Alexis Mission (OCA-Anchorage) - V. Rev. Michael Oleksa
St. Innocent Cathedral (OCA-Anchorage) - V. Rev. John Zabinko
St. Tikhon of Moscow Mission (OCA-Kenai) - Rev. Daniel Andrejuk
Holy Transfiguration Church (GOARCH) - Rev. Fr. Vasil Hillhouse
The Venerable Peter of Korish Serbian Orthodox Church-Parish (Serbian Orthodox Eparchy of Western America)

Eagle River 
St. John Cathedral (Antiochian) - Fr. Marc Dunaway

Eklutna Village / Chugiak 
 St. Nicholas Church (OCA-Anchorage)

Wasilla 
St. Herman Mission (Antiochian) - Fr. Matthew Howell 
St. Lazarus Mission (OCA-Anchorage) - Rev. Christopher Stanton  (THE MISSION IS NOW CLOSED)

Bristol Bay Borough

Naknek 
St. Anna the Mother of the Theotokos Church (OCA-Dillingham)

Portage Creek / Ohgsenakale 
St. Basil Church (OCA-Dillingham)

South Naknek 
Elevation of the Holy Cross Church (OCA-Dillingham)

Bethel Census Area

Aniak 
Protection of the Theotokos Chapel (OCA-Russian Mission)

Atmartluaq / Aniak 
St. Herman of Alaska Chapel (OCA-Bethel) - V. Rev. Phillip Alexie

Bethel 
St. Sophia Church (OCA-Bethel) - Rev. Daniel Charles

Chuathbaluk / Little Russian Mission 
St. Sergius Chapel (OCA-Anchorage)

Crooked Creek 
St. Nicholas Church (OCA-Russian Mission)

Eek 
St. Michael the Archangel Church (OCA-Bethel) - V. Rev. Nicholai Larson

Kasigluk 
Holy Trinity Church (OCA-Bethel) - Rev. Yakov Steven

Kongiganak 
St. Gabriel Church (OCA-Bethel) - V. Rev. Phillip Alexie

Kwethluk 
St. Nicholas Church (OCA-Bethel) - Rev. Alexander Larson

Kwigillingok 
St. Michael Church (OCA-Bethel) - V. Rev. Father Yako Stevens

Napaskiak 
St. James Church (OCA-Bethel) - Rev. Vasily Fisher

Nunapitchuk 
Presentation of the Theotokos Chapel (OCA-Bethel) - V. Rev. Phillip Alexie

Sleetmute 
SS. Peter and Paul Chapel (OCA-Russian Mission)

Stony River / Aniak 
St. Herman Chapel (OCA-Russian Mission)

Tuntutuliak 
St. Agaphia Church (OCA-Bethel) - V. Rev. Martin Nicolai

Dillingham Census Area

Aleknagik 
Holy Resurrection Chapel (OCA-Dillingham)

Clarks Point 
St. Innocent Enlightener of Alaska Mission (OCA-Dillingham)

Dillingham 
St. Seraphim of Sarov Church (OCA-Dillingham) - V. Rev. Victor Nick

Ekuk and Dillingham 
St. Nicholas Chapel (OCA-Dillingham)

Ekwok 
St. John Chapel (OCA-Dillingham)

Koliganek 
St. Michael the Archangel Chapel (OCA-Dillingham) - Rev. Ivan Gumlickpuk

New Stuyahok 
St. Sergius Church (OCA-Dillingham) - V. Rev. Alexie Askoak

Fairbanks North Star Borough

Fairbanks
 St. Herman Church (OCA-Anchorage) - Rev. Mikel Bock

Juneau City and Borough

Juneau 
St. Nicholas Russian Orthodox Church (OCA-Sitka) - Rev. Michael T Spainhoward
Saint Sava Church (now defunct)

Kenai Peninsula Borough

Homer 
All Saints of America Mission (Antiochian) - Fr. Paul W. Jaroslaw
St. Mary of Egypt Mission (OCA-Kenai)

Kenai 
Holy Assumption of the Virgin Mary Church (OCA-Kenai) - Rev. Thomas A Andrew

Nanwalek / English Bay 
Sts. Sergius and Herman of Valaam Church (OCA-Kenai) - Rev. Sergie Active

Ninilchik 
Transfiguration of Our Lord Chapel (OCA-Kenai) - V. Rev. Macarius Targonsky

Port Graham / Paluwik 
St. Herman of Alaska Church (OCA-Kenai) - Rev. David Ogan

Seldovia 
St. Nicholas Church (OCA-Kenai) - Rev. Sergie Active

Tyonek 
St. Nicholas Church (OCA-Anchorage)

Kodiak Island Borough

Akhiok 
Protection of the Theotokos Chapel (OCA-Kodiak)

Karluk 
Ascension of Our Lord Chapel (OCA-Kodiak) - Rev. John Dunlop

Kodiak 
Holy Resurrection Cathedral (OCA-Kodiak) - Rev. Innocent Dresdow
St. Nilus Island Skete, Kodiak Archipelago (Serbian Orthodox Eparchy of Western America)

Larsen Bay 
St. Herman Church (OCA-Kodiak)

Old Harbor 
Three Saints Church (OCA-Kodiak) - Rev. Hieromonk Ioasaph (Tucker)

Ouzinkie 
Nativity of Our Lord Chapel (OCA-Kodiak) - Rev. Evon Bereskin

Port Lions 
Nativity of the Theotokos Chapel (OCA-Kodiak)

Spruce Island / Ouzinkie 
SS. Sergius/Herman of Valaam Chapel (OCA)
 St. Archangel Michael Skete (Serbian Orthodox Eparchy of Western America)

Kusilvak Census Area

Marshall 
St. Michael Church (OCA-Russian Mission) - V. Rev. Maxim Isaac

Mountain Village 
St. Peter the Aleut Church (OCA-Russian Mission) - V. Rev. Stephan Heckman

Ohagamiut 
St. Vladimir Chapel (OCA-Russian Mission) - V. Rev. Stephan Heckman

Pilot Station 
Transfiguration of Our Lord Chapel (OCA-Russian Mission) - V. Rev. Stephan Heckman

Pitka's Point 
SS. Peter and Paul Chapel (OCA-Russian Mission) - V. Rev. Stephan Heckman

Russian Mission 
Elevation of the Holy Cross Church (OCA-Russian Mission) - V. Rev. Peter Askoar

Lake and Peninsula Borough

Chignik Lagoon 
Chignik Lagoon Mission (OCA-Dillingham) - V. Rev. Michael Trefon

Chignik Lake 
St. Nicholas Church (OCA-Dillingham) - V. Rev. Michael Trefon

Egegik 
Transfiguration of Our Lord Chapel (OCA-Dillingham)

Iguigig / King Salmon 
St. Nicholas Chapel (OCA-Dillingham) - V. Rev. David Askoak

Kokhonak / Iliamna 
SS. Peter and Paul Church (OCA-Dillingham) - V. Rev. David Askoak

Levelock 
Protection of the Virgin Mary Church (OCA-Dillingham) - V. Rev. David Askoak

Newhalen / Iliamna 
Transfiguration of Our Lord Church (OCA-Dillingham) - V. Rev. David Askoak

Nondalton 
St. Nicholas Church (OCA-Dillingham) - V. Rev. David Askoak

Perryville 
St. John the Theologian Church (OCA-Dillingham)

Pilot Point 
St. Nicholas Church (OCA-Dillingham)

Port Heiden 
St. Matrona Church (OCA-Dillingham)

Nome Census Area

St. Michael 
Orthodox Community (OCA-Russian Mission)

Sitka City and Borough

Sitka 
Annunciation of the Theotokos Chapel (OCA-Sitka)
St. Michael the Archangel Cathedral (OCA-Sitka) - Rev. Elia Larson

Skagway-Hoonah-Angoon Census Area

Angoon 
St. John the Baptist Church (OCA-Sitka)

Hoonah 
St. Nicholas Russian Orthodox Church (OCA-Sitka)

Valdez-Cordova Census Area

Chenega Bay 
Nativity of the Theotokos Church (OCA-Kenai)

Cordova 
St. Michael the Archangel Church (OCA-Kenai) - Rev. Alexei Kanagin

Tatitlek 
St. Nicholas Church (OCA-Kenai)

Valdez 
St. Nicholas Orthodox Community (OCA-Kenai)

Yukon-Koyukuk Census Area

Lime Village / McGrath 
SS. Constantine and Helen Chapel (OCA-Kenai) - V. Rev. Michael Trefon

Lower Kalskag 
St. Seraphim Chapel (OCA-Russian Mission) - Rev. Nicholai Isaac

Nikolai 
St. Nicholas Chapel (OCA-Anchorage)

Telida 
St. Basil Chapel (OCA-Anchorage)

External links

Antiochian Orthodox Christian Archdiocese of North America: Parish Listings for Alaska (3)
Greek Orthodox Archdiocese of America: Parish Listings for Alaska (1)
Alaska’s Russian Orthodox Churches

 
Alaska
Parishes